Foreign Language Bookshop was the oldest and largest language bookshop in Australasia, established in 1938 as a free lending library by William Bernard (WB) Wigston.

Brief history
WB opened the doors to Foreign Language Bookshop in Bourke Street, Melbourne in 1938.  The primary aim of the business was to reduce migrant isolation; particularly for European migrants from Germany, France, Italy, Czechoslovakia and Austria, disembarking from ships into Australia.

Over time, increasing immigration from many other countries sparked the need to expand into new languages—a trend which continues today.

Wigston was subsequently elected to the position of Mayor of the Bourke Street Traders Association.

History of owners (chronology)

William Bernard (WB) Wigston was born and raised in Ashtead Surrey, England, and was an entrepreneur who spent time in South Africa with his younger brother Nigel, managing mining operations in the late 1920s.  He migrated to Australia in the early 30s.

A well-to-do gentleman, when Foreign Language Bookshop was started in Bourke Street it started as a library and he mainly spent his time as a share trader, using “library” staff to help keep his share records. WB lived in a Toorak mansion with a live-in maid and his cat.

He would not allow married women to work for him but made an exception for Mrs Bess Carmichael who commenced working for him as a single lady and in later years was rostered to cover brief periods for other staff on leave or away ill.

During World War II, the library was forced to move to the corner of Bourke Street and Elizabeth Street. It was in this site that the library started to become a bookshop. Worried about his failing health in the 1940s, he used to have his chauffeur Herbie follow him around when taking his morning walks as he felt it would be socially inappropriate to pass away on his walk and be left lying on the road.  WB died in 1956.

WB left money in his will to all staff and willed the business of Foreign Language Bookshop to Mrs Connie Tink who sold it in 1959 to Mrs Felder, who sold it in 1966 to Mrs Leser.  In 1971 Mrs Leser sold the business to Mrs Annette Monester.

During 1982, Ms Monester moved the business to the top end of Collins Street.

FLB is now owned by the Bookery which in turn is owned by the university sector in Australia.

Since June 2020 Bookery ceased operating as a bookshop and is now exclusively online.

References

 https://www.caval.edu.au/solutions/language-resources
 http://www.bookeryeducation.com.au/edu_history.php

External links

Independent bookstores of Australia
Retail buildings in Victoria (Australia)